Kostroma is a historic city and the administrative center of Kostroma Oblast, Russia. A part of the Golden Ring of Russian cities, it is located at the confluence of the rivers Volga and Kostroma. Population:

History

Under the Rurikids
The official founding year of the city is 1152 by Yury Dolgoruky. Since many scholars believe that early Eastern Slavs tribes arrived in modern-day  Belarus, Ukraine and western Russia AD 400 to 600, Kostroma could be much older than previously thought.

The city has the same name as the East Slavic goddess Kostroma.

Like other towns of the Eastern Rus, Kostroma was sacked by the Mongols in 1238. It then constituted a small principality, under leadership of Prince Vasily of Kostroma, a younger brother of the famous Alexander Nevsky. Upon inheriting the grand ducal title in 1271, Vasily didn't leave the town for Vladimir, and his descendants ruled Kostroma for another half a century, until the town was bought by Ivan I of Moscow.

As one of the northernmost towns of the Grand Duchy of Moscow, Kostroma served for grand dukes as a place of retreat when enemies besieged Moscow in 1382, 1408, and 1433. In 1375, the town was looted by Novgorod pirates (ushkuiniks). The spectacular growth of the city in the 16th century may be attributed to the establishment of trade connections with English and Dutch merchants (Muscovy Company) through the northern port of Archangel. Boris Godunov had the Ipatiev and Epiphany monasteries rebuilt in stone. The construction works were finished just in time for the city to witness some of the most dramatic events of the Time of Troubles.

The heroic peasant Ivan Susanin became a symbol of the city's resistance to foreign invaders; several monuments to him may be seen in Kostroma. The future Tsar, Mikhail Romanov, also lived at the monastery. It was here that an embassy from Moscow offered him the Russian crown in 1612.

Under the Romanovs
A wooden house of Mikhail Romanov is still preserved in the monastery. There are also several old wooden structures transported to the monastery walls from distant districts of the Kostroma Oblast.

In 1773, Kostroma was devastated by a great fire. Afterwards the city was rebuilt with streets radiating from a single focal point near the river. They say that Catherine the Great dropped her fan on the city map, and told the architects to follow her design. One of the best preserved examples of the 18th century town planning, Kostroma retains some elegant structures in a "provincial neoclassical" style. These include a governor's palace, a fire tower, a rotunda on the Volga embankment, and an arcaded central market with a merchant church in the center.

During and after the Russian Revolution
The First Workers' Socialist Club based in Kostroma was one of the best documented workers' clubs run by Proletkult. Organised around the principle of a "public hearth" (obshchestvennyi ochag) this club combined both practical support for workers in need of accommodation, food or furniture, as well as providing a focus for popular education.

Recent history
The Nuclear Power Referendum was arranged in 1990 in the Kostroma area. 90% of the voting population were against nuclear power in the area.

Administrative and municipal status

Kostroma is the administrative center of the oblast and, within the framework of administrative divisions, it also serves as the administrative center of Kostromskoy District, even though it is not a part of it. As an administrative division, it is incorporated separately as the city of oblast significance of Kostroma—an administrative unit with a status equal to that of the districts. As a municipal division, the city of oblast significance of Kostroma is incorporated as Kostroma Urban Okrug.

Transportation
The city is served by the Kostroma Airport. Since 1887 there has been a railway connection between Kostroma and Moscow.

Sights and landmarks

Built in 1559-1565, the five-domed Epiphany Cathedral was the first stone edifice in the city; its medieval frescoes perished during a fire several years ago. The minster houses the city's most precious relic, a 10th-century Byzantine icon called Our Lady of St. Theodore. It was with this icon that Mikhail Romanov was blessed by his mother when he left for Moscow to claim the Russian throne. They say that just before the Revolution of 1917, the icon blackened so badly that the image was hardly visible; it was interpreted as a bad sign for the Romanov dynasty.

The Ipatyevsky monastery survives mostly intact, with its 16th-century walls, towers, belfry, and the 17th-century cathedral.

Apart from the monasteries, most of the city churches were either rebuilt or demolished during the Soviet years. The only city church that survives from the 17th-century "golden age" is the Resurrection church on the Lowlands (Russian: церковь Воскресения на Дебре). As the story goes, the church was commissioned by one merchant who ordered in England ten barrels of dye but received ten barrels of gold instead. He resolved that the unearned gold was the devil's gift and decided to spend it on building a church. Two other 17th-century temples, of rather conventional architecture, may be seen on the opposite side of the Volga.

Among the vestiges of the Godunov rule, a fine tent-like church in the urban-type settlement of Krasnoye-na-Volge (formerly an estate of Boris Godunov's brother) may be recommended.

Climate
Kostroma has a continental climate (Köppen Dfb). It has long, very cold winters and short warm summers.

Notable people

Olesya Barel (born 1960), basketball player
Nina Demme (1902-1977), polar explorer and biologist 
Aleksandra Ishimova (1805–1881), translator and author of children's books
Roman Kopin (born 1974), Governor of Chukotka Autonomous Okrug
Aleksey Pisemsky (1821–1881), novelist and dramatist
The Lubavitcher Rebbe, Rabbi Yosef Yitzchak Shneersohn was exiled to Kostroma by the USSR in 1927 for 3 years, and was released after 9 days

Twin towns – sister cities

Kostroma is twinned with:

 Aachen, Germany
 Babruysk, Belarus
 Bari, Italy
 Bat Yam, Israel
 Cetinje, Montenegro
 Ceadîr-Lunga, Moldavia
 Danilov, Russia
 Dole, France
Hyvinkää, Finland
 Ijevan, Armenia
 Ochamchira, Georgia
 Oral, Kazakhstan
 Piotrków Trybunalski, Poland

 Samokov, Bulgaria
 Sanmenxia, China
 Soroca, Moldavia
 Vrbas, Serbia

Following the 2022 Russian invasion of Ukraine, Durham County council revoked the twinning arrangements with Kostroma, which had been in place since 1968.

References

Notes

Sources

External links

Official website of Kostroma 

 
Kostroma Urban Okrug
Golden Ring of Russia
Kostromskoy Uyezd